Mirlan Abdraimovich Murzayev (born 29 March 1990) is a Kyrgyz professional footballer who plays as a forward for I-League club Mohammedan and the Kyrgyzstan national team.

Club career 
In January 2014, Murzayev moved to Denizlispor in the TFF First League on a six-month contract.

While playing for FC Dordoi Bishkek in May 2015, Murzayev became the 17th player to score 100 goals in Kyrgyzstan League and Cup matches.

In January 2016, Murzayev was linked with a move to Al-Ahli, a move that was blocked by his current club at the time, Afjet Afyonspor.

On 9 March 2019, Dordoi Bishkek announced the return of Murzayev. On 29 July 2019, Dordoi Bishkek announced that Murzayev was leaving the club to move the KTFF 1. Lig. On 5 August, Murzayev was announced as a new signing for Doğan Türk Birliği.

On 1 August 2021, Mirlan Murzayev joined Indian Super League side Chennaiyin FC on a one–year deal. He made his debut on 23 November against Hyderabad FC in a 1–0 win. He scored his first goal on 18 December in their 2–1 win against Odisha.

On 17 July 2022, Mirlan would join Navbahor Namangan on a free from Alga. In December, he returned to India to play in the I-League, signing with Mohammedan Sporting.

Career statistics

International
Statistics accurate as of match played 29 March 2022

International goals
Scores and results list Kyrgyzstan's goal tally first.

Honours
Dordoi Bishkek
Kyrgyzstan League: 2007, 2008, 2009
AFC President's Cup: 2007

References

External links

1990 births
Living people
People from Jalal-Abad Region
Kyrgyzstani footballers
Kyrgyzstan international footballers
Association football forwards
FC Dordoi Bishkek players
FC Lokomotiv Moscow players
Hapoel Petah Tikva F.C. players
Utaş Uşakspor footballers
Denizlispor footballers
FC Alga Bishkek players
navbahor Namangan players
Israeli Premier League players
TFF First League players
Kyrgyzstani expatriate footballers
Expatriate footballers in Israel
Expatriate footballers in Russia
Expatriate footballers in Turkey
Expatriate footballers in Bahrain
Kyrgyzstani expatriate sportspeople in Israel
Kyrgyzstani expatriate sportspeople in Russia
Kyrgyzstani expatriate sportspeople in Turkey
Kyrgyzstani expatriate sportspeople in Bahrain
Kyrgyzstani people of Russian descent
Footballers at the 2010 Asian Games
2019 AFC Asian Cup players
Asian Games competitors for Kyrgyzstan
Kyrgyzstani expatriate sportspeople in India
Expatriate footballers in India
Indian Super League players
Chennaiyin FC players